Al Tall was a Valencian folk music group from Valencia in Spain.  It was formed in 1975 by Vicent Torrent, Manuel Miralles, and Miquel Gil. and was dissolved in October 2012.

Al Tall created and interpreted the folk trend "riproposta", Italian term that means the recovery not only of ancient melodies and romances, but modern creation based on the basic sounds and traditional forms of music.

Al Tall is a part -together Milladoiro (Galicia) Oskorri (Basque Country) and "Nuevo Mester de Juglaría" (Castile) - the set of bands which consolidated the folk music from different Iberian traditions as a new folk genre from which have developed hundreds of groups.

Discography

Bibliography

References

External links

 Catalan (Valencian) website
 English website

Spanish folk music groups
Musical groups established in 1975